The North Atlantic Conference was a short-lived intercollegiate athletic conference of HBCUs that existed only during the 1946 season. The league had members in the state of Pennsylvania.

Football champions
1946 – Cheyney State

See also
List of defunct college football conferences

References

Defunct college sports conferences in the United States
College sports in Pennsylvania